ISO 3166-2:RU is the entry for Russia in ISO 3166-2, part of the ISO 3166 standard published by the International Organization for Standardization (ISO), which defines codes for some of the names of the principal subdivisions (e.g., provinces or states) of all countries coded in ISO 3166-1. ISO 3166-2:RU contains no codes for the Russian-administered Republic of Crimea and Federal City of Sevastopol, which are internationally recognized as part of Ukraine and do have codes in Ukraine's entry in ISO 3166-2.

Currently for Russia, ISO 3166-2 codes are defined for the following federal subjects:
 21 republics
 9 administrative territories
 46 administrative regions
 2 autonomous cities
 1 autonomous region
 4 autonomous districts

Each code consists of two parts, separated by a hyphen. The second part is either of the following:
 two letters: republics
 three letters: all other subdivisions

Current codes
Subdivision names are listed as in the ISO 3166-2 standard published by the ISO 3166 Maintenance Agency (ISO 3166/MA).

Click on the button in the header to sort each column.

Changes
The following changes to the entry have been announced by the ISO 3166/MA since the first publication of ISO 3166-2 in 1998.  ISO stopped issuing newsletters in 2013.

See also
 Subdivisions of Russia
 FIPS region codes of Russia
 GOST 7.67 (Russian ISO-based standard for Cyrillic and Latin coding for Russian regions and countries)

External links
 ISO Online Browsing Platform: RU
 Subjects of Russia, Statoids.com

2:RU
ISO 3166-2
Russia geography-related lists